Love Past Thirty is a 1934 American pre-Code comedy film directed by Vin Moore and starring Aileen Pringle, Theodore von Eltz and Phyllis Barry.

Synopsis
After she is ditched by her boyfriend for her younger niece, a woman develops a plan to try and win him back.

Cast
 Aileen Pringle as Caroline Burt
 Theodore von Eltz as Charles Browne
 Phyllis Barry as Beth Ramsden
 John Marston as Walter Ramsden
 Robert Frazer as Don Meredith
 Gertrude Messinger as Zelda Burt
 Steve Pendleton as Sam Adair 
 Virginia Sale as Nettle
 Ben Hall as Junior Burt
 Pat O'Malley as Lon Burt
 Dot Farley as Dressmaker
 Mary Carr as Grandma Nelson

References

Bibliography
 Pitts, Michael R. Poverty Row Studios, 1929-1940. McFarland & Company, 2005.

External links
 

1934 films
1934 comedy films
American comedy films
Films directed by Vin Moore
1930s English-language films
1930s American films